Caturla is a surname. Notable people with the surname include:

Alejandro García Caturla (1906–1940), Cuban composer 
Antonio Vidal Caturla (1923–1999), Spanish footballer
Manuel Torres Caturla (born 1989), Spanish footballer
Teté Caturla (born 1937), Cuban singer